Taiping rolling stock depot is the rolling stock depot of Line 2, Suzhou Rail Transit with a total area of over 200 thousand square meters. It is located in Xiangcheng District, Suzhou.

Construction started in September 2011, and finished in December 2013 along with Line 2. This depot will also be combined with markets and apartments.

References

Suzhou Rail Transit
Railway depots in China